Adam Duffy (born 30 March 1989) is an English professional snooker player.

Duffy qualified for the 2011–12 professional Main Tour as one of four semi-finalists from the third and final Q School event.

Career

Debut season
As a new player on the tour Duffy would need to win four qualifying matches to reach the main stage of the ranking event tournaments. He came closest to doing this in the sixth event of the year, the Welsh Open, where he received a bye through round one and then beat James Wattana and Jack Lisowski, before being whitewashed 0–4 by former world champion Peter Ebdon in the final qualifying round. He also reached the last 16 of Event 2 of the minor-ranking Players Tour Championship series, which included a 4–0 victory over world number one Mark Selby. Duffy finished his first year as a professional ranked world number 62, inside the top 64 who guarantee their places for the 2012–13 season. He was the second highest ranked of all the new players on the tour, after China's Yu Delu who was number 58.

2012/2013 season
Duffy had a poor 2012–13 season as he lost his first six games and only won a total of four matches in ranking event qualifiers and two matches in Players Tour Championship tournaments. He finished a lowly 108th on the PTC Order of Merit, but did end the season ranked world number 60, his highest ranking to date.

2013/2014 season
In his opening match, Duffy defeated Tony Drago 5–2 to qualify for the 2013 Wuxi Classic in China, but lost 5–3 to Lu Ning in the wildcard round. At the UK Championship Duffy beat Barry Pinches in a deciding frame to face reigning world champion Ronnie O'Sullivan in the second round. He led twice before the interval but went on to lose 6–3. His results during the year meant that he dropped 31 places to world number 91 in the rankings to drop off the tour, with Duffy entering Q School in an attempt to win his place back. He came within two victories of doing so in the second event, but lost 4–3 to Lee Walker.

2014/2015 season
Duffy entered all the European Tour events during the season, and thanks to his high Q School ranking he was able to enter a number of ranking tournaments as well. At the Paul Hunter Classic, Duffy overcame Ryan Day and Gerard Greene both 4–3, before losing 4–0 to Fergal O'Brien in the last 32. He qualified for the Indian Open by beating Jack Lisowski 4–2 and then edged out Gary Wilson 4–3 to play Judd Trump in the second round. Duffy came from 3–1 down to level at 3–3, but would lose the deciding frame to the world number six in a three-hour match. However, the display seemed to give him confidence heading into the World Championship as he defeated Martin Gould 10–6 and won seven of the last eight frames to beat Sam Baird 10–7. Duffy played Jamie Jones in an attempt to become the first player from Sheffield to play at the Crucible, but was narrowly beaten 10–8. Duffy felt he had run out of steam during the match against an opponent who had been playing in tournaments all year, while Duffy had his playing opportunities limited due to his amateur status. In the first event of Q School, Duffy reached the final round and made breaks of 107, 93 and 70 against Eden Sharav but lost 4–3.

2015/2016 season
In the first round of the 2015 UK Championship, Duffy pulled off a huge shock by eliminating world number nine and two-time winner of the event Ding Junhui 6–2. He credited the win to working hard on his game at the academy in Sheffield. He forced a deciding frame against Joe Swail in the next round having been 5–3 down, but lost it. He qualified for the China Open by beating Thepchaiya Un-Nooh 5–3, but would later withdraw from the event. Duffy lost in the final round of the EBSA Qualifying Tour Play-Offs to Sam Craigie, but by twice losing in the fifth round of Q School he earned a two-year tour card via the Order of Merit.

2016/2017 season
He played in the final qualifying round for the Shanghai Masters after winning three matches, but was edged out 5–4 by Robert Milkins. Duffy lost in the second round of both the Paul Hunter Classic and Northern Ireland Open 4–1 to Lee Walker and 4–3 to Peter Ebdon respectively. He was beaten in eight of his final nine matches of the season after this.

2017/2018
Duffy had a very poor season. His best performance was reaching the last stage of the World Championship Qualifiers where he lost 10–2 to Xiao Guodong. There was controversy in the 2nd frame where the ref called a waistcoat foul when Duffy was reaching across to pot the brown. He only required the brown and blue to win the frame, however Guodong cleared up to take a 2–0 lead.

He dropped off the tour at the end of the 2017/18 season and entered Q School to win back his tour place, but his best result was a loss in the final round of the second event to Craig Steadman. He entered again in 2019.

Personal life
Duffy works part-time as a builder for his father's firm. He is a big fan of Sheffield Wednesday F.C.

Performance and rankings timeline

Career finals

Pro-am finals: 1 (1 title)

Amateur finals: 3 (2 titles)

References

External links

 
Adam Duffy at worldsnooker.com

English snooker players
Living people
1989 births
Sportspeople from Sheffield